David Joseph Silvestri (born September 29, 1967) is a former infielder in Major League Baseball from 1992 to 1999. He also played for the United States baseball team at the 1988 Summer Olympics.

Playing career
Silvestri attended the University of Missouri, where he played for the Missouri Tigers baseball team. He was drafted by the Houston Astros in the second round of the 1988 Major League Baseball draft. That year, he played internationally for the United States baseball team in the 1988 Baseball World Cup, where he batted .333/.407/.542 with 10 runs as the club's shortstop. He won a silver medal with the team. He also played in the 1988 Seoul Olympics, winning a gold medal.

Before the 1990 season, Silvestri was traded with a player to be named later to the New York Yankees for infielder Orlando Miller. During the 1995 season, he was traded to the Montreal Expos for a minor league player.

Managing career
Silvestri managed the Hudson Valley Renegades of the New York–Penn League in 2000 and the Great Falls Dodgers of the Pioneer League in 2001.

References
http://www.baseball-almanac.com/players/player.php?p=silveda01
http://www.baseball-reference.com/s/silveda01.shtml
http://mlb.mlb.com/team/player.jsp?player_id=122236#gameType=%27R%27

External links 

1967 births
Living people
Albany-Colonie Yankees players
All-American college baseball players
American expatriate baseball players in Canada
Anaheim Angels players
Baseball players at the 1987 Pan American Games
Baseball players at the 1988 Summer Olympics
Baseball players from St. Louis
Columbus Clippers players
Durham Bulls players
Edmonton Trappers players
Major League Baseball third basemen
Medalists at the 1988 Summer Olympics
Minor league baseball managers
Missouri Tigers baseball players
Montreal Expos players
New York Yankees players
Oklahoma City 89ers players
Olympic gold medalists for the United States in baseball
Osceola Astros players
Pan American Games medalists in baseball
Pan American Games silver medalists for the United States
Prince William Cannons players
Tampa Bay Devil Rays players
Texas Rangers players
Medalists at the 1987 Pan American Games
Mat-Su Miners players